Richmond Cricket Club may refer to:

In England:
 Richmond Cricket Club (18th century), a leading English club in the 18th century, it was first recorded in 1720 and ceased to exist sometime after 1805
 Richmond Cricket Club (London), a present-day London club that competes in the Middlesex County Cricket League
 Richmondshire Cricket Club, a club based in Richmond, North Yorkshire

Other:
 Richmond Cricket Club (Melbourne), a Melbourne-based grade cricket club that was also known as the Monash Tigers from 2013–20
 Richmond Cricket Club (Canada), a British Columbian club that was founded in 1966 and competes in the British Columbia Mainland Cricket League